The following Confederate States Army units and commanders fought in the Battle of Olustee of the American Civil War. The Union order of battle is listed separately.

Military Rank Abbreviations Used

 BG = Brigadier General
 Col = Colonel
 Ltc = Lieutenant Colonel
 Maj = Major
 Cpt = Captain
 Lt = Lieutenant

District of East Florida
BG Joseph Finegan

References
 Battle of Olustee Web site with history of units and soldiers

American Civil War orders of battle